Suzette Harbin (July 4, 1915 – September 5, 1994) was an American actress and dancer.

Early life
Harbin was from Ledbetter, Texas. 
Harbin was raised in California, first in Pacific Grove, California, and then in Los Angeles. Harbin graduated from Jefferson High School in 1934, soon after the school's buildings were destroyed in the 1933 Long Beach earthquake.

Career
Harbin worked as an artists' model in Los Angeles in the 1930s. Harbin's film appearances included roles in So Red the Rose (1935), Up Jumped the Devil (1941), Cabin in the Sky (1943), Stormy Weather (1943), I Dood It (1943), Jam Session (1944), To Have and Have Not (1944), Ziegfeld Follies (1945), Look-Out Sister (1947), The Foxes of Harrow (1947), The Pirate (1948), Sky Dragon (1949), Destination Murder (1950), The Cimarron Kid (1952), Skirts Ahoy! (1952), Lydia Bailey (1952), Bomba and the Jungle Girl (1952), The Green-Eyed Blonde (1957). She was also in an episode of the television program Wagon Train (1958). She was sometimes told that she was "too pretty" for the roles available to African-American actresses in mainstream films of the 1940s and 1950s.

In 1954, Harbin went to Korea to give 25 performances for American troops at military installations there, headlining the "first all-Negro entertainment package to tour Korea." She also toured military bases in Alaska that year, in a troupe where she was the only African-American performer. 

In 1960 she retired to the Monterey Peninsula and directed children's theatre; she also worked as a Monterey County juvenile officer. She moved back to Texas in 1980, and worked as a tour guide at the airport in San Antonio.

Personal life
Harbin married Hildred Claude Johnson in 1938, and for a time used the name Suzette Harbin-Johnson. She was injured in a car accident in 1952. She married caricature artist Calvin Bailey in 1954. Harbin died in 1994, aged 79 years, in San Antonio, Texas.

Filmography

References

External links

Harbin on the cover of Jet magazine (July 22, 1954).

1915 births
1994 deaths
American actresses
20th-century American women